The olive, botanical name Olea europaea, meaning 'European olive' in Latin, is a species of small tree or shrub in the family Oleaceae, found traditionally in the Mediterranean Basin. When in shrub form, it is known as Olea europaea 'Montra', dwarf olive, or little olive. The species is cultivated in all the countries of the Mediterranean, as well as in Australia, New Zealand, North and South America and South Africa. Olea europaea is the type species for the genus Olea. The tree and its fruit give their name to the Oleaceae plant family, which also includes species such as lilac, jasmine, forsythia, and the true ash tree.

The olive's fruit, also called an "olive", is of major agricultural importance in the Mediterranean region as the source of olive oil; it is one of the core ingredients in Mediterranean cuisine. 
Thousands of cultivars of the olive tree are known. Olive cultivars may be used primarily for oil, eating, or both. Olives cultivated for consumption are generally referred to as "table olives". About 80% of all harvested olives are turned into oil, while about 20% are used as table olives.

Etymology
The word olive derives from Latin  'olive fruit; olive tree', possibly through Etruscan 𐌀𐌅𐌉𐌄𐌋𐌄 (eleiva) from the archaic Proto-Greek form *ἐλαίϝα (*elaíwa) (Classic Greek   'olive fruit; olive tree'. The word for 'oil' in multiple other languages also ultimately derives from the name of this tree and its fruit.

Description

The olive tree, Olea europaea, is an evergreen tree or shrub native to Mediterranean Europe, Asia, and Africa. It is short and squat and rarely exceeds  in height. 'Pisciottana', a unique variety comprising 40,000 trees found only in the area around Pisciotta in the Campania region of southern Italy, often exceeds this, with correspondingly large trunk diameters. The trunk is typically gnarled and twisted.

The small, white, feathery flowers, with ten-cleft calyx and corolla, two stamens, and bifid stigma, are borne generally on the previous year's wood, in racemes springing from the axils of the leaves.

Olives are harvested in the green to purple stage. Olea europaea contains a pyrena commonly referred to in American English as a "pit", and in British English as a "stone".

Taxonomy
The six natural subspecies of Olea europaea are distributed over a wide range:

Olea europaea subsp. europaea (Mediterranean Basin)

The subspecies europaea is divided into two varieties, the europaea, which was formerly named Olea sativa, with the seedlings called "olivasters", and silvestris, which corresponds to the old wildly growing Mediterranean species Olea oleaster, with the seedlings called "oleasters". The sylvestris is characterized by a smaller tree bearing noticeably smaller fruit.

O. e. subsp. cuspidata (from South Africa throughout East Africa, Arabia to Southwest China)
O. e. subsp. cerasiformis (Madeira); also known as Olea maderensis
O. e. subsp. guanchica (Canary Islands)
O. e. subsp. laperrinei (Algeria, Sudan, Niger)
O. e. subsp. maroccana (Morocco)

The subspecies O. e. cerasiformis is tetraploid, and O. e. maroccana is hexaploid. Wild-growing forms of the olive are sometimes treated as the species Olea oleaster, or "oleaster." The trees referred to as "white" and "black" olives in Southeast Asia are not actually olives but species of Canarium.

Cultivars

Hundreds of cultivars of the olive tree are known. An olive's cultivar has a significant impact on its color, size, shape, and growth characteristics, as well as the qualities of olive oil. Olive cultivars may be used primarily for oil, eating, or both. Olives cultivated for consumption are generally referred to as "table olives".

Since many olive cultivars are self-sterile or nearly so, they are generally planted in pairs with a single primary cultivar and a secondary cultivar selected for its ability to fertilize the primary one. In recent times, efforts have been directed at producing hybrid cultivars with qualities useful to farmers, such as resistance to disease, quick growth, and larger or more consistent crops.

History

Mediterranean Basin
Fossil evidence indicates the olive tree had its origins 20–40 million years ago in the Oligocene, in what is now corresponding to Italy and the eastern Mediterranean Basin. Around 100,000 years ago, olives were used by humans in Africa, on the Atlantic coast of Morocco, for fuel management and most probably for consumption. Wild olive trees, or oleasters, were present and collected in the Eastern Mediterranean since ~19,000 BP. The genome of cultivated olives reflects their origin from oleaster populations in the Eastern Mediterranean. The olive plant was first cultivated some 7,000 years ago in Mediterranean regions.

For thousands of years olives were grown primarily for lamp oil, with little regard for culinary flavor. Its origin can be traced to the Levant based on written tablets, olive pits, and wood fragments found in ancient tombs. As far back as 3000 BC, olives were grown commercially in Crete; they may have been the source of the wealth of the Minoan civilization.

The ancestry of the cultivated olive is unknown. Fossil olea pollen has been found in Macedonia and other places around the Mediterranean, indicating that this genus is an original element of the Mediterranean flora. Fossilized leaves of olea were found in the palaeosols of the volcanic Greek island of Santorini and dated to about 37,000 BP. Imprints of larvae of olive whitefly Aleurobus olivinus were found on the leaves. The same insect is commonly found today on olive leaves, showing that the plant-animal co-evolutionary relations have not changed since that time. Other leaves found on the same island are dated back to 60,000 BP, making them the oldest known olives from the Mediterranean.

Outside the Mediterranean

Olives are not native to the Americas. Spanish colonists brought the olive to the New World, where its cultivation prospered in present-day Peru, Chile, and Argentina. The first seedlings from Spain were planted in Lima by Antonio de Rivera in 1560. Olive tree cultivation quickly spread along the valleys of South America's dry Pacific coast where the climate was similar to the Mediterranean. Spanish missionaries established the tree in the 18th century in California. It was first cultivated at Mission San Diego de Alcalá in 1769 or later around 1795. Orchards were started at other missions, but in 1838, an inspection found only two olive orchards in California. Cultivation for oil gradually became a highly successful commercial venture from the 1860s onward.

In Japan, the first successful planting of olive trees happened in 1908 on Shodo Island, which became the cradle of olive cultivation in Japan. 

In 2016, olive oil production started in India, with olive saplings planted in Rajasthan's Thar Desert.

Favoured by climate warming, several small-scale olive production farms have also been established at fairly high latitudes in Europe and North America since the early 21st century.

An estimated 865 million olive trees were in the world as of 2005, and the vast majority of these were found in Mediterranean countries, with traditionally marginal areas accounting for no more than 25% of olive-planted area and 10% of oil production.

Symbolic connotations

Olive oil has long been considered sacred and holy. The olive branch has often been a symbol of abundance, glory, and peace. The leafy branches of the olive tree were ritually offered to deities and powerful figures as emblems of benediction and purification, and they were used to crown the victors of friendly games and bloody wars. Today, olive oil is still used in many religious ceremonies. Over the years, the olive has also been used to symbolize wisdom,  fertility, power, and purity.

Ancient Greece

Olives are thought to have been domesticated in the third millennium BC at the latest, at which point they, along with grain and grapes, became part of Colin Renfrew's triad of Greek staple crops that fueled the emergence of more complex societies. Olives, and especially (perfumed) olive oil, became a major export product during the Minoan and Mycenaean periods. Dutch archaeologist Jorrit Kelder proposed that the Mycenaeans sent shipments of olive oil, probably alongside live olive branches, to the court of the Egyptian pharaoh Akhenaten as a diplomatic gift. In Egypt, these imported olive branches may have acquired ritual meanings, as they are depicted as offerings on the wall of the Aten temple and were used in wreaths for the burial of Tutankhamun. It is likely that, as well as being used for culinary purposes, olive oil was also used to various other ends, including as a perfume. 

The ancient Greeks smeared olive oil on their bodies and hair as a matter of grooming and good health. Olive oil was used to anoint kings and athletes in ancient Greece. It was burnt in the sacred lamps of temples and was the "eternal flame" of the original Olympic games. Victors in these games were crowned with its leaves. In Homer's Odyssey, Odysseus crawls beneath two shoots of olive that grow from a single stock, and in the Iliad, (XVII.53ff) there is a metaphoric description of a lone olive tree in the mountains, by a spring; the Greeks observed that the olive rarely thrives at a distance from the sea, which in Greece invariably means up mountain slopes. Greek myth attributed to the primordial culture-hero Aristaeus the understanding of olive husbandry, along with cheese-making and bee-keeping. Olive was one of the woods used to fashion the most primitive Greek cult figures, called xoana, referring to their wooden material; they were reverently preserved for centuries. 

It was purely a matter of local pride that the Athenians claimed that the olive grew first in Athens. In an archaic Athenian foundation myth, Athena won the patronage of Attica from Poseidon with the gift of the olive. According to the fourth-century BC father of botany, Theophrastus, olive trees ordinarily attained an age around 200 years, he mentions that the very olive tree of Athena still grew on the Acropolis; it was still to be seen there in the second century AD; and when Pausanias was shown it  c. 170 AD, he reported "Legend also says that when the Persians fired Athens the olive was burnt down, but on the very day it was burnt it grew again to the height of two cubits." Indeed, olive suckers sprout readily from the stump, and the great age of some existing olive trees shows that it was possible that the olive tree of the Acropolis dated to the Bronze Age. The olive was sacred to Athena and appeared on the Athenian coinage. According to another myth, Elaea was an accomplished athlete killed by her fellow athletes who had grown envious of her; but Athena and Gaia turned her into an olive tree as reward.

Theophrastus, in On the Causes of Plants, does not give as systematic and detailed an account of olive husbandry as he does of the vine, but he makes clear (in 1.16.10) that the cultivated olive must be vegetatively propagated; indeed, the pits give rise to thorny, wild-type olives, spread far and wide by birds. Theophrastus reports how the bearing olive can be grafted on the wild olive, for which the Greeks had a separate name, kotinos. In his Enquiry into Plants (2.1.2–4) he states that the olive can be propagated from a piece of the trunk, the root, a twig, or a stake.

Ancient Rome

According to Pliny the Elder, a vine, a fig tree, and an olive tree grew in the middle of the Roman Forum; the olive was planted to provide shade (the garden plot was recreated in the 20th century). The Roman poet Horace mentions it in reference to his own diet, which he describes as very simple: "As for me, olives, endives, and smooth mallows provide sustenance." Lord Monboddo comments on the olive in 1779 as one of the foods preferred by the ancients and as one of the most perfect foods.

Vitruvius describes of the use of charred olive wood in tying together walls and foundations in his De Architectura:

The thickness of the wall should, in my opinion, be such that armed men meeting on top of it may pass one another without interference. In the thickness there should be set a very close succession of ties made of charred olive wood, binding the two faces of the wall together like pins, to give it lasting endurance. For that is a material which neither decay, nor the weather, nor time can harm, but even though buried in the earth or set in the water it keeps sound and useful forever. And so not only city walls but substructures in general and all walls that require a thickness like that of a city wall, will be long in falling to decay if tied in this manner.

Judaism and Christianity
Olives were one of the main elements in ancient Israelite cuisine. Olive oil was used for not only food and cooking, but also lighting, sacrificial offerings, ointment, and anointment for priestly or royal office. The olive tree is one of the first plants mentioned in the Hebrew Bible (the Christian Old Testament), and one of the most significant. An olive branch (or leaf, depending on translation) was brought back to Noah by a dove to demonstrate that the flood was over (Book of Genesis 8:11).

The olive is listed in Deuteronomy 8:8 as one of the seven species that are noteworthy products of the Land of Israel. According to the Halakha, the Jewish law mandatory for all Jews, the olive is one of the seven species that require the recitation of me'eyn shalosh after they are consumed. Olive oil is also the most recommended and best possible oil for the lighting of the Shabbat candles.

The Mount of Olives, east of Jerusalem, is mentioned several times in the New Testament. The Allegory of the Olive Tree in St. Paul's Epistle to the Romans refers to the scattering and gathering of Israel. It compares the Israelites to a tame olive tree and the Gentiles to a wild olive branch. The olive tree itself, as well as olive oil and olives, play an important role in the Bible.

Islam
The olive tree and olive oil are mentioned seven times in the Quran, and the olive is praised as a precious fruit. Olive tree and olive oil health benefits have been propounded in prophetic medicine. Muhammad is reported to have said: "Take oil of olive and massage with it – it is a blessed tree" (Sunan al-Darimi, 69:103). Olives are substitutes for dates (if not available) during Ramadan fasting, and olive tree leaves are used as incense in some Muslim Mediterranean countries.

United States
The Great Seal of the United States first used in 1782 depicts an eagle clutching an olive branch in one of its talons, indicating the power of peace.

United Nations
The Flag of the United Nations adopted in 1946 is a world map with two olive branches.

Oldest known trees

 An olive tree in Mouriscas, Abrantes, Portugal, (Oliveira do Mouchão) is one of the oldest known olive trees still alive to this day, with an estimated age of 3,350 years, planted approximately at the beginning of the Atlantic Bronze Age. 
 An olive tree in the city of Bar in Montenegro has an estimated age between 2,014 and 2,480 years.
 An olive tree on the island of Brijuni in Croatia has a radiocarbon dating age of about 1,600 years.
 An olive tree in west Athens, named "Plato's Olive Tree", is thought to be a remnant of the grove where Plato's Academy was situated, making it an estimated 2,400 years old. The tree comprised a cavernous trunk from which a few branches were still sprouting in 1975, when a traffic accident caused a bus to uproot it. Following that, the trunk was preserved and displayed in the nearby Agricultural University of Athens. In 2013, it was reported that the remaining part of the trunk was uprooted and stolen, allegedly to serve as firewood. 
 The age of an olive tree in Crete, the Finix Olive, is claimed to be over 2,000 years old; this estimate is based on archaeological evidence around the tree. 
 The olive tree of Vouves in Crete has an age estimated between 2,000 and 4,000 years. 
 An olive tree called Farga d'Arió in Ulldecona, Catalonia, Spain, has been estimated (with laser-perimetry methods) to date back to 314 AD, which would mean that it was planted when Constantine the Great was Roman emperor.
 Some Italian olive trees are believed to date back to Ancient Rome (8th century BC to 5th century AD), although identifying progenitor trees in ancient sources is difficult. Several other trees of about 1,000 years old are within the same garden. The 15th-century trees of Olivo della Linza, at Alliste in the Province of Lecce in Apulia on the Italian mainland, were noted by Bishop Ludovico de Pennis during his pastoral visit to the Diocese of Nardò-Gallipoli in 1452.
 The village of Bcheale, Lebanon, claims to have the oldest olive trees in the world (4000 BC for the oldest), but no scientific study supports these claims. Other trees in the towns of Amioun appear to be at least 1,500 years old.
 Several trees in the Garden of Gethsemane (from the Hebrew words gat shemanim or olive press) in Jerusalem are claimed to date back to the time of Jesus. A study conducted by the National Research Council of Italy in 2012 used carbon dating on older parts of the trunks of three trees from Gethsemane and came up with the dates of 1092, 1166, and 1198 AD, while DNA tests show that the trees were originally planted from the same parent plant. According to molecular analysis, the tested trees showed the same allelic profile at all microsatellite loci analyzed which furthermore may indicate attempt to keep the lineage of an older species intact. However, Bernabei writes, "All the tree trunks are hollow inside so that the central, older wood is missing . . . In the end, only three from a total of eight olive trees could be successfully dated. The dated ancient olive trees do not, however, allow any hypothesis to be made with regard to the age of the remaining five giant olive trees." Babcox concludes, "The roots of the eight oldest trees are possibly much older. Visiting guides to the garden often state that they are two thousand years old."
 The 2,000-year-old Bidni olive trees on Malta, which have been confirmed through carbon dating, have been protected since 1933 and are listed in UNESCO's Database of National Cultural Heritage Laws. In 2011, after recognising their historical and landscape value, and in recognition of the fact that "only 20 trees remain from 40 at the beginning of the 20th century", Maltese authorities declared the ancient Bidni olive grove at Bidnija as a Tree Protected Area.

Uses
The olive tree, Olea europaea, has been cultivated for olive oil, fine wood, olive leaf, ornamental reasons, and the olive fruit. About 80% of all harvested olives are turned into oil, while about 20% are used as table olives. The olive is one of the "trinity" or "triad" of basic ingredients in Mediterranean cuisine, the other two being wheat for bread, pasta, and couscous; and the grape for wine.

Olive oil 
Olive oil is a liquid fat obtained from olives, produced by pressing whole olives and extracting the oil. It is commonly used in cooking, for frying foods or as a salad dressing. It is also used in cosmetics, pharmaceuticals, and soaps, and as a fuel for traditional oil lamps, and has additional uses in some religions. Spain accounts for almost half of global olive oil production; other major producers are Portugal, Italy, Tunisia, Greece and Turkey. Per capita consumption is highest in Greece, followed by Italy and Spain.

The composition of olive oil varies with the cultivar, altitude, time of harvest and extraction process. It consists mainly of oleic acid (up to 83%), with smaller amounts of other fatty acids including linoleic acid (up to 21%) and palmitic acid (up to 20%). Extra virgin olive oil is required to have no more than 0.8% free acidity and is considered to have favorable flavor characteristics.

Table olives

Table olives are classified by the International Olive Council (IOC) into three groups according to the degree of ripeness achieved before harvesting:
 Green olives are picked when they have obtained full size, while unripe; they are usually shades of green to yellow and contain the bitter phytochemical oleuropein.
 Semi-ripe or turning-colour olives are picked at the beginning of the ripening cycle, when the colour has begun to change from green to multicolour shades of red to brown. Only the skin is coloured, as the flesh of the fruit lacks pigmentation at this stage, unlike that of ripe olives.
 Black olives or ripe olives are picked at full maturity when fully ripe, displaying colours of purple, brown or black. To leach the oleuropein from olives, commercial producers use lye, which neutralizes the bitterness of oleuropein, producing a mild flavour and soft texture characteristic of California black olives sold in cans. Such olives are typically preserved in brine and sterilized under high heat during the canning process.

Fermentation and curing 

Raw or fresh olives are naturally very bitter; to make them palatable, olives must be cured and fermented, thereby removing oleuropein, a bitter phenolic compound that can reach levels of 14% of dry matter in young olives. In addition to oleuropein, other phenolic compounds render freshly picked olives unpalatable and must also be removed or lowered in quantity through curing and fermentation. Generally speaking, phenolics reach their peak in young fruit and are converted as the fruit matures. Once ripening occurs, the levels of phenolics sharply decline through their conversion to other organic products which render some cultivars edible immediately. One example of an edible olive native to the island of Thasos is the throubes black olive, which becomes edible when allowed to ripen in the sun, shrivel, and fall from the tree.

The curing process may take from a few days with lye, to a few months with brine or salt packing. With the exception of California style and salt-cured olives, all methods of curing involve a major fermentation involving bacteria and yeast that is of equal importance to the final table olive product. Traditional cures, using the natural microflora on the fruit to induce fermentation, lead to two important outcomes: the leaching out and breakdown of oleuropein and other unpalatable phenolic compounds, and the generation of favourable metabolites from bacteria and yeast, such as organic acids, probiotics, glycerol, and esters, which affect the sensory properties of the final table olives. Mixed bacterial/yeast olive fermentations may have probiotic qualities. Lactic acid is the most important metabolite, as it lowers the pH, acting as a natural preservative against the growth of unwanted pathogenic species. The result is table olives which can be stored without refrigeration. Fermentations dominated by lactic acid bacteria are, therefore, the most suitable method of curing olives. Yeast-dominated fermentations produce a different suite of metabolites which provide poorer preservation, so they are corrected with an acid such as citric acid in the final processing stage to provide microbial stability.

The many types of preparations for table olives depend on local tastes and traditions. The most important commercial examples are listed below.

Lebanese or Phoenician fermentation
Applied to green, semiripe, or ripe olives. Olives are soaked in salt water for 24-48 hours. Then they are slightly crushed with a rock to hasten the fermentation process. The olives are stored for a period of up to a year in a container with salt water, lemon juice, lemon peels, laurel and olive leaves, and rosemary. Some recipes may contain white vinegar or olive oil.

Spanish or Sevillian fermentation
Most commonly applied to green olive preparation, around 60% of all the world's table olives are produced with this method. Olives are soaked in lye (dilute NaOH, 2–4%) for 8–10 hours to hydrolyse the oleuropein. They are usually considered "treated" when the lye has penetrated two-thirds of the way into the fruit. They are then washed once or several times in water to remove the caustic solution and transferred to fermenting vessels full of brine at typical concentrations of 8–12% NaCl. The brine is changed on a regular basis to help remove the phenolic compounds. 

Fermentation is carried out by the natural microbiota present on the olives that survive the lye treatment process. Many organisms are involved, usually reflecting the local conditions or terroir of the olives. During a typical fermentation gram-negative enterobacteria flourish in small numbers at first but are rapidly outgrown by lactic acid bacteria species such as Leuconostoc mesenteroides, Lactobacillus plantarum, Lactobacillus brevis and Pediococcus damnosus. These bacteria produce lactic acid to help lower the pH of the brine and therefore stabilize the product against unwanted pathogenic species. A diversity of yeasts then accumulate in sufficient numbers to help complete the fermentation alongside the lactic acid bacteria. Yeasts commonly mentioned include the teleomorphs Pichia anomala, Pichia membranifaciens, Debaryomyces hansenii and Kluyveromyces marxianus. 

Once fermented, the olives are placed in fresh brine and acid corrected, to be ready for market.

Sicilian or Greek fermentation
Applied to green, semiripe and ripe olives, they are almost identical to the Spanish type fermentation process, but the lye treatment process is skipped and the olives are placed directly in fermentation vessels full of brine (8–12% NaCl). The brine is changed on a regular basis to help remove the phenolic compounds. As the caustic treatment is avoided, lactic acid bacteria are only present in similar numbers to yeast and appear to be outdone by the abundant yeasts found on untreated olives. As very little acid is produced by the yeast fermentation, lactic, acetic, or citric acid is often added to the fermentation stage to stabilize the process.

Picholine or directly-brined fermentation
Applied to green, semi-ripe, or ripe olives, they are soaked in lye typically for longer periods than Spanish style (e.g. 10–72 hours) until the solution has penetrated three-quarters of the way into the fruit. They are then washed and immediately brined and acid corrected with citric acid to achieve microbial stability. Fermentation still occurs carried out by acidogenic yeast and bacteria but is more subdued than other methods. The brine is changed on a regular basis to help remove the phenolic compounds, and a series of progressively stronger concentrations of salt are added until the product is fully stabilized and ready to be eaten.

Water-cured fermentation
Applied to green, semi-ripe, or ripe olives, these are soaked in water or weak brine and this solution is changed on a daily basis for 10–14 days. The oleuropein is naturally dissolved and leached into the water and removed during a continual soak-wash cycle. Fermentation takes place during the water treatment stage and involves a mixed yeast/bacteria ecosystem. Sometimes, the olives are lightly cracked with a blunt instrument to trigger fermentation and speed up the fermentation process. Once debittered, the olives are brined to concentrations of 8–12% NaCl and acid corrected and are then ready to eat.

Salt-cured fermentation
Applied only to ripe olives, since it is only a light fermentation. They are usually produced in Morocco, Turkey, and other eastern Mediterranean countries. Once picked, the olives are vigorously washed and packed in alternating layers with salt. The high concentration of salt draws the moisture out of olives, dehydrating and shriveling them until they look somewhat analogous to a raisin. Once packed in salt, fermentation is minimal and only initiated by the most halophilic yeast species such as Debaryomyces hansenii. Once cured, they are sold in their natural state without any additives. So-called oil-cured olives are cured in salt, and then soaked in oil.

California or artificial ripening
Applied to green and semi-ripe olives, they are placed in lye and soaked. Upon their removal, they are washed in water injected with compressed air, without fermentation. This process is repeated several times until both oxygen and lye have soaked through to the pit. The repeated, saturated exposure to air oxidises the skin and flesh of the fruit, turning it black in an artificial process that mimics natural ripening. Once fully oxidised or "blackened", they are brined and acid corrected and are then ready for eating.

Olive wood

Olive wood is very hard and is prized for its durability, colour, high combustion temperature, and interesting grain patterns. Because of the commercial importance of the fruit, slow growth, and relatively small size of the tree, olive wood and its products are relatively expensive. Common uses of the wood include: kitchen utensils, carved wooden bowls, cutting boards, fine furniture, and decorative items. The yellow or light greenish-brown wood is often finely veined with a darker tint; being very hard and close-grained, it is valued by woodworkers.

Ornamental uses
In modern landscape design olive trees are frequently used as ornamental features for their distinctively gnarled trunks and "evergreen" silvery gray foliage.

Cultivation

The earliest evidence for the domestication of olives comes from the Chalcolithic period archaeological site of Teleilat el Ghassul in modern Jordan. Farmers in ancient times believed that olive trees would not grow well if planted more than a certain distance from the sea; Theophrastus gives 300 stadia as the limit. Modern experience does not always confirm this, and, though showing a preference for the coast, they have long been grown further inland in some areas with suitable climates, particularly in the southwestern Mediterranean (Iberia and northwest Africa) where winters are mild. An article on olive tree cultivation in Spain is brought down in Ibn al-'Awwam's 12th-century agricultural work, Book on Agriculture.

Olives are cultivated in many regions of the world with Mediterranean climates, such as South Africa, Chile, Peru, Pakistan, Australia, Oregon, and California, and in areas with temperate climates such as New Zealand. They are also grown in the Córdoba Province, Argentina, which has a temperate climate with rainy summers and dry winters.

Growth and propagation

Olive trees show a marked preference for calcareous soils, flourishing best on limestone slopes and crags, and coastal climate conditions. They grow in any light soil, even on clay if well drained, but in rich soils, they are predisposed to disease and produce poor quality oil. (This was noted by Pliny the Elder.) Olives like hot weather and sunny positions without any shade, while temperatures below  may injure even a mature tree. They tolerate drought well because of their sturdy and extensive root systems. Olive trees can remain productive for centuries as long as they are pruned correctly and regularly.

Only a handful of olive varieties can be used to cross-pollinate. 'Pendolino' olive trees are partially self-fertile, but pollenizers are needed for a large fruit crop. Other compatible olive tree pollinators include 'Leccino' and 'Maurino'. 'Pendolino' olive trees are used extensively as pollinizers in large olive tree groves.

Olives are propagated by various methods. The preferred ways are cuttings and layers; the tree roots easily in favourable soil and throws up suckers from the stump when cut down. However, yields from trees grown from suckers or seeds are poor; they must be budded or grafted onto other specimens to do well. Branches of various thickness cut into lengths around  planted deeply in manured ground soon vegetate. Shorter pieces are sometimes laid horizontally in shallow trenches and, when covered with a few centimetres of soil, rapidly throw up sucker-like shoots. In Greece, grafting the cultivated tree on the wild tree is a common practice. In Italy, embryonic buds, which form small swellings on the stems, are carefully excised and planted under the soil surface, where they soon form a vigorous shoot.

The olive is also sometimes grown from seed. To facilitate germination, the oily pericarp is first softened by slight rotting, or soaked in hot water or in an alkaline solution.

In situations where extreme cold has damaged or killed the olive tree, the rootstock can survive and produce new shoots which in turn become new trees. In this way, olive trees can regenerate themselves. In Tuscany in 1985, a very severe frost destroyed many productive and aged olive trees and ruined many farmers' livelihoods. However, new shoots appeared in the spring and, once the dead wood was removed, became the basis for new fruit-producing trees.

Olives grow very slowly, and over many years, the trunk can attain a considerable diameter. A. P. de Candolle recorded one exceeding  in girth. The trees rarely exceed  in height and are generally confined to much more limited dimensions by frequent pruning. Olives are very hardy and are resistant to disease and fire. Its root system is robust and capable of regenerating the tree even if the above-ground structure is destroyed. 

The crop from old trees is sometimes enormous, but they seldom bear well two years in succession, and in many cases, a large harvest occurs every sixth or seventh season. Where the olive is carefully cultivated, as in Liguria, Languedoc, and Provence, the trees are regularly pruned. The pruning preserves the flower-bearing shoots of the preceding year, while keeping the tree low enough to allow the easy gathering of the fruit. The spaces between the trees are regularly fertilized.

Pests, diseases, and weather
Various pathologies can affect olives. The most serious pest is the olive fruit fly (Dacus oleae or Bactrocera oleae) which lays its eggs in the olive most commonly just before it becomes ripe in the autumn. The region surrounding the puncture rots, becomes brown, and takes a bitter taste, making the olive unfit for eating or for oil. For controlling the pest, the practice has been to spray with insecticides (organophosphates, e.g. dimethoate). Classic organic methods have been applied such as trapping, applying the bacterium Bacillus thuringiensis, and spraying with kaolin.  Such methods are obligatory for organic olives.

A fungus, Cycloconium oleaginum, can infect the trees for several successive seasons, causing great damage to plantations. A species of bacterium, Pseudomonas savastanoi pv. oleae, induces tumour growth in the shoots. Certain lepidopterous caterpillars feed on the leaves and flowers. Xylella fastidiosa bacteria, which can also infect citrus fruit and vines, has attacked olive trees in Apulia, southern Italy, causing olive quick decline syndrome (OQDS). The main vector is Philaenus spumarius (meadow spittlebug).

A pest which spreads through olive trees is the black scale bug, a small black scale insect that resembles a small black spot. They attach themselves firmly to olive trees and reduce the quality of the fruit; their main predators are wasps. The curculio beetle eats the edges of leaves, leaving sawtooth damage.

Rabbits eat the bark of olive trees and can do considerable damage, especially to young trees. If the bark is removed around the entire circumference of a tree, it is likely to die. Voles and mice also do damage by eating the roots of olives. At the northern edge of their cultivation zone, for instance in northern Italy, or southern France and Switzerland, olive trees suffer occasionally from frost. Gales and long-continued rains during the gathering season also cause damage. In the colder Mediterranean hinterland, olive cultivation is replaced by other fruits, typically the chestnut.

As an invasive species

Since its first domestication, O. europaea has been spreading back to the wild from planted groves. Its original wild populations in southern Europe have been largely swamped by feral plants.

In some other parts of the world where it has been introduced, most notably South Australia, the olive has become a major woody weed that displaces native vegetation. In South Australia, its seeds are spread by the introduced red fox and by many bird species, including the European starling and the native emu, into woodlands, where they germinate and eventually form a dense canopy that prevents regeneration of native trees. As the climate of South Australia is very dry and bushfire prone, the oil-rich feral olive tree substantially increases the fire hazard of native sclerophyll woodlands.

Harvesting

Olives are harvested in the autumn and winter. More specifically in the Northern Hemisphere, green olives are picked from the end of September to about the middle of November. In the Southern Hemisphere, green olives are picked from the middle of October to the end of November, and black olives are collected worldwide from the middle of November to the end of January or early February. In southern Europe, harvesting is done for several weeks in winter, but the time varies in each country, and with the season and the cultivar.

Most olives today are harvested by shaking the boughs or the whole tree. Using olives found lying on the ground can result in poor quality oil, due to damage. Another method involves standing on a ladder and "milking" the olives into a sack tied around the harvester's waist. This method produces high quality oil.  A third method uses a device called an oli-net that wraps around the tree trunk and opens to form an umbrella-like catcher from which workers collect the fruit. Another method uses an electric tool, the beater (abbacchiatore in Italian), that has large tongs that spin around quickly, removing fruit from the tree. Olives harvested by this method are used for oil.

Table olive varieties are more difficult to harvest, as workers must take care not to damage the fruit; baskets that hang around the worker's neck are used. In some places in Italy, Croatia, and Greece, olives are harvested by hand because the terrain is too mountainous for machines. As a result, the fruit is not bruised, which leads to a superior finished product. The method also involves sawing off branches, which is healthy for future production.

The amount of oil contained in the fruit differs greatly by cultivar; the pericarp is usually 60–70% oil.

Global production
Olives are one of the most extensively cultivated fruit crops in the world. Only coconut trees and oil palms command more space. The 10 most-producing countries, according to the Food and Agriculture Organization, are all located in the Mediterranean region and produce 95% of the world's olives.

Nutrition

One hundred grams of cured green olives provide 146 calories, are a rich source of vitamin E (25% of the Daily Value, DV), and contain a large amount of sodium (104% DV); other nutrients are insignificant. Green olives are 75% water, 15% fat, 4% carbohydrates and 1% protein (table).

Phytochemicals
The polyphenol composition of olive fruits varies during fruit ripening and during processing by fermentation when olives are immersed whole in brine or crushed to produce oil. In raw fruit, total polyphenol contents, as measured by the Folin method, are 117 mg/100 g in black olives and 161 mg/100 g in green olives, compared to 55 and 21 mg/100 g for extra virgin and virgin olive oil, respectively. Olive fruit contains several types of polyphenols, mainly tyrosols, phenolic acids, flavonols and flavones, and for black olives, anthocyanins. The main bitter flavor of olives before curing results from oleuropein and its aglycone which total in content, respectively, 72 and 82 mg/100 g in black olives, and 56 and 59 mg/100 g in green olives.

During the crushing, kneading and extraction of olive fruit to obtain olive oil, oleuropein, demethyloleuropein and ligstroside are hydrolyzed by endogenous beta-glucosidases to form aldehydes, dialdehydes, and aldehydic aglycones. Polyphenol content also varies with olive cultivar and the manner of presentation, with plain olives having higher contents than those that are pitted or stuffed.

Allergenic potential
Olive tree pollen is extremely allergenic, with an OPALS allergy scale rating of 10 out of 10. Olea europaea is primarily wind-pollinated and its light, buoyant pollen is a strong trigger for asthma. One popular variety, "Swan Hill", is widely sold as an "allergy-free" olive tree; however, this variety does bloom and produce allergenic pollen.

Gallery

See also
 List of olive cultivars
 Moria (tree)
 Olive skin

References

External links

 Agricultural Research Service, US Department of Agriculture; Germplasm Resources Information Network (GRIN): Olea europaea
 Most Common Spanish Olea Trees, Ginart Oleas

 
Flora of France
Cocktail garnishes
Drought-tolerant trees

Flora of Macaronesia
Flora of Northeast Tropical Africa
Flora of East Tropical Africa
Flora of South Tropical Africa
Flora of Southern Africa
Flora of the Western Indian Ocean
Flora of the Arabian Peninsula
Flora of Western Asia
Flora of Southeastern Europe
Flora of Southwestern Europe
Garden plants of Africa
Garden plants of Asia
Garden plants of Europe
Medicinal plants
Ornamental trees
Plants used in bonsai
Plants described in 1753
Symbols of Athena
Trees of Africa
Trees of Europe
Trees of Ethiopia
Trees of Mediterranean climate
Trees of Morocco
Trees of Turkey
Tree crops
Domesticated crops
Mediterranean cuisine
Drupes
Plants in the Bible
Spanish cuisine
Taxa named by Carl Linnaeus
Flora of the Mediterranean Basin